Alan's Big One FM was a short radio series that ran from 1994–1995.  There were 13 hour-long episodes and it was broadcast on BBC Radio 1.  The host was Alan Davies.

References

External links 

 http://epguides.com/AlansBigOne/

 http://www.radiolistings.co.uk/programmes/a/al/alan_s_big_one_fm.html

1994 radio programme debuts
1995 radio programme endings
BBC Radio 1 programmes